Avon is an unincorporated community located along Highway 1 in southwestern Washington County, Mississippi, USA.

it has a post office, with the ZIP code 38723.

References

External links

Unincorporated communities in Washington County, Mississippi
Unincorporated communities in Mississippi